Tri-County Middle-Senior High School is a public high school located in Wolcott, Indiana.

Athletics

Tri-County Middle-Senior High School's athletic teams are the Cavaliers and they compete in 1A class sports and formerly in  the Hoosier Heartland Conference. Tri-County was a former member of the Midwest Athletic  Conference (IHSAA). They will rejoin with the Midwest Athletic Conference (IHSAA) in the 2018 school year. The school offers a wide range of athletics including:

Baseball (1998 state baseball 1A champions. 2000 state baseball 1A runners-up.)
Basketball (Men's and Women's)
Cheerleading
Cross Country (Men's and Women's)
Football
Golf (Men's and Women's)
Softball
Track and Field (Men's and Women's)
Volleyball
Wrestling

FFA

FFA chapter was #1 in the state for the year 2000.
In 2017, member Blayne Vandeveer won the National FFA Creed speaking contest. 
In 2018, Tri-County FFA member, Micah Lehe won the National FFA Extemporaneous Speaking contest.
The chapter has had numerous members compete at the national level in contests including Agriscience, Agricultural Issues, Marketing, and Veterinary Science. The advisors are Travis Scherer and Haley Verhaeghe.

See also
 List of high schools in Indiana

References

External links
 Official Website

Schools in White County, Indiana
Public high schools in Indiana
Public middle schools in Indiana
1971 establishments in Indiana